Ruslan Hryhorovych Dmytrenko (born 22 March 1986 in Kyiv Oblast) is a Ukrainian racewalker.

Career
He competed in the 20 km walk at the 2012 Summer Olympics, where he placed 30th.

In February 2019 року he was disqualified until 4 May 2020 for doping rules violation and all his results from 14 August 2009 to 3 August 2012 were annulled.

He was injured in a car crash in March 2020.

Competition record

References

1986 births
Living people
Ukrainian male racewalkers
Olympic athletes of Ukraine
Athletes (track and field) at the 2012 Summer Olympics
Athletes (track and field) at the 2016 Summer Olympics
World Athletics Championships athletes for Ukraine
Universiade medalists in athletics (track and field)
Universiade silver medalists for Ukraine
Doping cases in athletics
Ukrainian sportspeople in doping cases
World Athletics Race Walking Team Championships winners
Medalists at the 2013 Summer Universiade
Recipients of the Order of Danylo Halytsky
Sportspeople from Kyiv Oblast
20th-century Ukrainian people
21st-century Ukrainian people